NGC 5728 is an active barred spiral galaxy located 146 million light years away in the southern constellation of Libra. It was discovered on May 7, 1787 by William Herschel. The designation comes from the New General Catalogue of J. L. E. Dreyer, published in 1888. The galaxy shows a red shift of 0.00935 and has a heliocentric radial velocity of 2,803 km/s.

The morphological classification of this galaxy is SAB(r)a?, which indicates a weakly barred spiral galaxy (SAB) with a ring-like structure (r) and possible tightly wound arms (a?). The Spitzer galactic survey lists a morphology code of (R1)SB(r′l,bl,nr,nb)0/a, meaning a barred spiral having a closer outer ring and an inner pseudo-ring/lens, plus a nuclear ring and bar/bar-lens. Vera Rubin described it as having a "distinct elliptical structure intermediate between a spheroid and a disk". Asymmetrical gas distribution in the galaxy suggests it has undergone a minor merger event that did not produce tidal tails.

In addition to the main bar, there is what appears to be a counter-rotating nuclear bar in the inner , which is at an angle of 60° from the main bar. There is evidence of star formation, but that has nearly ceased in the nuclear region due to the molecular gas being all but exhausted. The nuclear bar, if it exists, now consists of stars with little surrounding gas.

This is a Seyfert galaxy of type 1.9, indicating it has an obscured active galactic nucleus (AGN) powered by a supermassive black hole at the center. X-ray and radio jets have been detected. The nucleus is being fed by spiraling filaments and dust lanes from the surrounding galaxy. The AGN itself is hidden behind a bar of dust approximately 64 pc in length.

The type Ia supernova SN 2009Y was reported in February 2009, before it reached maximum.

References

External links
 

Libra (constellation)
Barred spiral galaxies
Seyfert galaxies
5728